Étienne-Joseph-Théophile Thoré (better known as Théophile Thoré-Bürger) (23 June 1807 – 30 April 1869) was a French journalist and art critic. He is best known today for rediscovering the work of painter Johannes Vermeer and several other prominent Dutch artists.

Biography
Thoré-Bürger was born in La Flèche, Sarthe. His career as art critic started in the 1830s, but he was also active as a political journalist. In March 1848 he founded La Vraie République, which Louis-Eugène Cavaignac soon banned. A year later, in March 1849, he founded another newspaper, Le Journal de la vraie République, which Cavaignac also banned. Consequently, Thoré-Bürger went into exile to Brussels and continued publishing articles as Willem Bürger. He returned to France after the amnesty of 1859, dying in Paris ten years later.

Today, Thoré-Bürger is best known for rediscovering the work of Johannes Vermeer and several other prominent Dutch artists, such as Frans Hals (he was the first to describe the portrait of Malle Babbe), Carel Fabritius, and others. Thoré-Bürger's interest in Vermeer began in 1842 when he saw the View of Delft in the Mauritshuis of The Hague. Vermeer's name was wholly forgotten at the time; Thoré-Bürger was so impressed with the View of Delft that he spent the years before his exile searching for other works by the painter. He would eventually publish descriptions and a catalogue of Vermeer's work, although many of the paintings he attributed to the master were later proven to have been executed by others.

He lived for more than a decade with Apolline Lacroix, the wife of his collaborator Paul Lacroix, the curator of the Bibliothèque de l'Arsenal. On Thoré-Bürger's death, she inherited his valuable art collection, much of which was eventually sold.

Selected publications
Dictionnaire de phrénologie et de physiognomonie, à l'usage des artistes, des gens du monde, des instituteurs, des pères de famille, des jurés, etc., 1836 Available online
La Vérité sur le parti démocratique, 1840 Available online
Catalogue de dessins des grands maîtres, provenant du cabinet de M. Villenave, 1842
Le Salon de 1844, précédé d'une lettre à Théodore Rousseau, 1844
Dessins de maîtres, Collection de feu M. Delbecq, de Gand, 1845 Available online
Catalogue des estampes anciennes formant la collection de feu M. Delbecq, de Gand, 1845 Available online
La Recherche de la liberté, 1845
Le Salon de 1845, précédé d'une lettre à Béranger, 1845
Le Salon de 1846, précédé d'une Lettre à George Sand, 1846 Available online
Le Salon de 1847, précédé d'une Lettre à Firmin Barrion, 1847 Available online
Mémoires de Caussidière, ex-préfet de police et représentant du peuple, with Marc Caussidière, 2 vol., 1849 Available online: 1, 2
La Restauration de l'autorité, ou l'Opération césarienne, 1852
Dans les bois, 1856
En Ardenne, par quatre Bohémiens. Namur, Dinant, Han, Saint-Hubert, Houffalize, La Roche, Durbuy, Nandrin, Comblain, Esneux, Tilf, Spa, in collaboration with other writers, 1856
Trésors d'art exposés à Manchester en 1857 et provenant des collections royales, des collections publiques et des collections particulières de la Grande-Bretagne, 1857
Amsterdam et La Haye. Études sur l'école hollandaise, 1858
Çà & là, 1858
Musées de la Hollande, 2 vol., 1858–1860
Études sur les peintres hollandais et flamands. Galerie d'Arenberg, à Bruxelles avec le catalogue complet de la collection, 1859
Musée d'Anvers, 1862
Trésors d'art en Angleterre, 1862
Van der Meer (Vermeer) de Delft, 1866

Published posthumously
Les Salons : études de critique et d'esthétique, 3 vol., 1893
Thoré-Bürger peint par lui-même : lettres et notes intimes, 1900 Available online

References

External links
 

1807 births
1869 deaths
People from La Flèche
French art critics
Burials at Père Lachaise Cemetery
19th-century French journalists
Male journalists
19th-century French male writers
Johannes Vermeer scholars
Scholars of Dutch art
French art collectors